The Tampere City Hall is a Neo-Renaissance building in Tampere, Finland, situated at the edge of the Tampere Central Square. The current city hall was built in 1890 and was designed by Georg Schreck. The palacial building has many halls and the city of Tampere holds many events there. During the Great Strike in 1905, the so-called "Red Manifest" was read from the balcony of the Tampere City Hall.

See also
 Tampere City Central Office Building

External links

 The Tampere City Hall at the Tampere city guide
 The Tampere City Hall at the Koskesta voimaa online publication

Buildings and structures in Tampere